Farm tools could refer to:

 List of agricultural machinery
 Garden tools that are the same as agricultural tools
 Variant of the Pick-up sticks game